Cirrhigaleus is a genus of sharks in the Squalidae (dogfish) family, which is part of the Squaliformes order.

Species
 Cirrhigaleus asper Merrett, 1973 (roughskin spurdog)
 Cirrhigaleus australis W. T. White, Last & Stevens, 2007 (southern mandarin dogfish) 
 Cirrhigaleus barbifer S. Tanaka (I), 1912 (mandarin dogfish)

References

 

 
Shark genera
Taxa named by Shigeho Tanaka